The Warlord is a sword and sorcery character appearing in American comic books published by DC Comics. Created by writer-artist Mike Grell, he debuted in 1st Issue Special #8 (November 1975). The titular character, Travis Morgan, obtains the name "Warlord" as he fights for the freedom of the people of Skartaris.

Development
Grell described the Warlord's genesis "as a comic strip called Savage Empire... Savage Empire was born of my admiration for Hal Foster's Prince Valiant and Burne Hogarth's Tarzan, combined with my fascination with archaeology and lost civilizations." Grell described pitching his idea to DC Comics: "I completely revised the concept from Savage Empire into The Warlord. The story of an archeologist who stumbles through a time portal and winds up in Atlantis became the story of US spy pilot whose SR-71 is damaged while on a mission over Russia and plunges through an opening at the North pole into the world at the center on the earth, where creatures of from mythology and Earth's ancient past co-exist amid fantastic cities and leftovers of the civilization of Atlantis... drawing on many sources, including my own US Air Force experiences to lend a note of authenticity to the characters background. Choosing the new setting was easy, as a kid one of my favorite books was Jules Verne's 1864 classic Journey to the Center of the Earth, I [also] drew on...The Smoky God, The Hollow Earth, and Edgar Rice Burroughs' Pellucidar series."

Publication history
The character the Warlord debuted in 1st Issue Special #8 (cover-dated November 1975). The decision to give the Warlord his own series had already been made by the time his 1st Issue Special debut went into production. He starred in The Warlord #1 (February 1976), followed by an eight-month hiatus after issue #2, picking up again with #3 (November 1976). The title lasted 133 issues until Winter 1988. Creator Mike Grell wrote and drew the comic for six years, handing over the art chores after issue #59 (July 1982). Issues #53 through #71 were ghost-written by Grell's then-wife Sharon Wright.

Backup features
A continuation of Jack Kirby's OMAC series, by Jim Starlin, was featured as a backup for several issues (#37–39 and #42–47). Arak, Son of Thunder, created by Roy Thomas and Ernie Colón, first appeared in a special insert in The Warlord #48 (August 1981). Claw the Unconquered appeared in a two–part backup feature in issues #48–49 by Jack C. Harris and Thomas Yeates. Dragonsword was a backup feature by Paul Levitz and Yeates which appeared in #51–54 (November 1981–February 1982). Arion, a sword and sorcery title by writer Paul Kupperberg and artist Jan Duursema, began as a six–page backup feature in The Warlord #55 (March 1982). Another backup feature was The Barren Earth by writer Gary Cohn and artist Ron Randall, which was concluded in a four–issue limited series. A Bonus Book in issue #131 (September 1988) featured artist Rob Liefeld's first work for DC.

Volume 2
A six-issue miniseries ran cover-dated January to June 1992. It was written by Mike Grell and penciled by Dameon Willich, with inks by Rick Hoberg (#1-3) and Tim Burgard (#4-6).

Volume 3
DC attempted to update The Warlord in 2006 with Bruce Jones writing and Bart Sears providing the art. This series restarted the concept, beginning with Travis Morgan arriving in Skartaris. The series left a number of story points unanswered as issue #9 finished on a cliffhanger, while the tenth and final issue had a standalone story set sometime in the future.

Volume 4
The Warlord returned in an ongoing series written by Mike Grell in time for the original series' 35th anniversary. The series started in April 2009, featuring art by Joe Prado and Chad Hardin. It ran for 16 issues.

Fictional character biography

Vietnam War veteran SR-71 pilot Travis Morgan passed through a hole in the Earth's crust while flying over the north pole in 1969 and landed in the underground world of Skartaris, a place strongly reminiscent of Edgar Rice Burroughs's Pellucidar. There Travis, wielding his .44 AutoMag pistol and joined by Shamballah's Princess (later Queen) Tara, a scantily dressed savage, became The Warlord and fought villains such as the evil sorcerer Deimos as well as various kings. He gained various sidekicks such as Machiste, Shakira, a Russian scientist named Mariah and his magic-wielding daughter Jennifer Morgan. In one story arc, Morgan even becomes the U.S. President in the far future.

Although The Warlord has a superficial resemblance to the DC character Oliver Queen, he is in reality based more upon his creator Mike Grell who was a former member of the Air Force. Grell is caricatured in The Warlord's first appearance, 1st Issue Special #8 and is clearly sporting The Warlord's signature shaggy goatee. Grell and editor Jack C. Harris made a metafictional appearance in the story "Gambit" in The Warlord #35 (July 1980).

Volume 4 of the series begins with an explorer finding perfectly preserved dinosaur remains in the Himalayas. She takes the head of one to a doctor and an expedition is set up to retrieve more samples. The team is spotted by the Chinese government and flee into the caves after losing several members. They discover a portal and after walking through find themselves in Skartaris where they encounter Travis Morgan. Travis Morgan is attacked by a giant bird and kills it with the help of Shakira. Refugees enter Shamballah and Morgan discovers that a new god has taken over the Shadow Kingdom and has overrun the Kingdom of Kiro, Machiste's homeland. One of the refugees is injured and he surprisingly carries a gunshot wound.

The machinations of Deimos' return pit Travis Morgan against Tinder. Just as Morgan realizes that Tinder is in fact his son Joshua, he becomes distracted and Tinder mortally wounds him. Travis Morgan's final words were "I thought I'd have more time". Morgan is cremated and Tinder becomes the new Warlord.

Joshua Morgan becomes the new Warlord. His costume is reminiscent of Travis Morgan's black outfit when he first arrived in Skartaris. Instead of carrying a sword and a gun as Travis did, Tinder carries a sword, a dagger, a quiver of arrows and a bow.

Other versions
In the alternate timeline of the Flashpoint storyline, The Warlord is the pirate of a fleet when he was attacked by pirate Deathstroke in battle stealing their loot. During the battle, The Warlord's crew was killed while he escaped using the hovercraft. Later, The Warlord plans to attack Deathstroke and retrieve Jenny Blitz who has been in stasis since she was stolen from him. The Warlord ambushed Deathstroke and his fleet and demanded that they surrender. In answer Deathstroke shot The Warlord's right eye using a scoped sniper rifle. He had been aiming for his mouth. Deathstroke fired at The Warlord's ship again, and it unexpectedly blew up. Each ship in Warlord's fleet subsequently exploded. The ships were destroyed by Jenny Blitz, now released from her stasis tube due to an earlier skirmish between Ocean Master and Icicle, one of Deathstroke's crewmen. Jenny appears to be able to project explosive force from her hands.

In other media

Television
The Warlord appeared in the Justice League Unlimited episode "Chaos at the Earth's Core", voiced by Paul Guilfoyle. Green Lantern, Supergirl, Stargirl, and S.T.R.I.P.E. stumbled onto Skartaris and teamed up with him to stop Deimos and his unlikely allies Metallo and Silver Banshee of the Secret Society from stealing a huge piece of kryptonite rock. The Warlord dueled with Deimos, ending with Deimos plummeting down a ledge. Tara, Machiste, Mariah, Shakira, and Jennifer Morgan also appeared in this episode.

Toys
 In 1982, several of the characters from The Warlord became action figures in a line called "Lost World of The Warlord" from Remco. Travis Morgan was one of the figures along with Deimos, Machiste, Mikola Rostov, Arak, and Hercules.
 In April 2007, The Warlord became an action figure (based on the modern update) in Series 4 of DC Direct's "First Appearance" figures.
 In 2010, The Warlord became an action figure based on the animated version in the Justice League Unlimited toyline.

Popular culture
The Warlord issue #89 (Jan. 1985) appears on a magazine rack in a convenience store in a deleted scene from The Goonies DVD.

Collected editions
 DC Comics reprinted several early stories from The Warlord in DC Special Blue Ribbon Digest #10 (June 1981). This digest size collection included a new wraparound painted cover by Mike Grell and an introduction. 
 DC’s First Issue Specials collects 1st Issue Special #8, 272 pages, March 2020, 
 The Warlord: The Savage Empire (1991) - collects 1st Issue Special #8 and The Warlord #1–10 and 12, November 1991, 240 pages, 
 Showcase Presents: The Warlord (2009) - collects 1st Issue Special #8 and The Warlord #1–28, September 2009, 528 pages, 
 DC Through the 80s: The End of Eras collects The Warlord #42, 520 pages, December 2020, 
 DC Through the 80s: The Experiments collects The Warlord #48 and 55, 504 pages, May 2021, 
 Warlord: The Saga - collects The Warlord vol. 4 #1–6, March 2010, 144 pages, 
 Countdown Special: OMAC #1 (2008) - collects OMAC backup stories from The Warlord #37–39 as well as OMAC #1 and DC Comics Presents #61.

References

External links
 
 The Warlord at the Unofficial Guide to the DC Universe

1976 comics debuts
1988 comics endings
1992 comics endings
2007 comics endings
2010 comics endings
Characters created by Mike Grell
Comics by Dan Jurgens
Comics by Michael Fleisher
Comics characters introduced in 1975
DC Comics fantasy characters
DC Comics military personnel
DC Comics superheroes
DC Comics titles
Defunct American comics
Fantasy comics
Fictional aviators
Fictional swordfighters in comics
Fictional United States Air Force personnel
Fictional Vietnam War veterans
Fictional warlords
Hollow Earth in fiction
Lost world comics